Michael Colgan is an American research scientist. He started the Colgan Institute in 1983 which is a consulting, educational and research facility primarily concerned with the effects of nutrition and exercise on athletic performance, aging and the prevention of degenerative disease. Colgan has served as a consultant to a number of international companies and government agencies. He currently is on the Scientific Advisory Board for the network marketing product Isagenix International. Colgan is a member of the American Academy of Anti-Aging Medicine, the American College of Sports Medicine, the British Society for Nutritional Medicine, and the International and American Associations of Clinical Nutritionists. He is also a Fellow of the American College of Nutrition.

Colgan's books cover several areas including nutrition for strength and muscular development, nutritional strategies and methods to slow the aging process, and nutritional methods to prevent disease.

Bibliography
Your Personal Vitamin profile No longer in print (1982)
Prevent Cancer Now: Your Guide to Self Protection (1992)
Optimum Sports Nutrition: Your Competitive Edge No longer in print(1993)
The New Nutrition: Medicine for the Millennium No longer in print (1996)
Hormonal Health: Nutritional and Hormonal Strategies for Emotional Well-Being & Intellectual Longevity (1996)
The Flavonoid Revolution: Grape Seed Extract and Other Flavonoids Against Disease (1997)
Creatine for Muscle and Strength No longer in print (1997)
Win the War Against Arthritis No longer in print (1999)
The Right Protein for Muscle and Strength No longer in print (1999)
Essential Fats No longer in print (1999)
Antioxidants, the Real Story (1999)
Beat Arthritis (1999)
Protect Your Prostate (2000)
Sports Nutrition Guide: Minerals, Vitamins & Antioxidants for Athletes No longer in print (2002)
All New Sports Nutrition Guide No longer in print (2002)Perfect Posture: The Basis Of Power (2002)New Power Program: New Protocols for Maximum Strength (2004)Nutrition For Champions (2007)Save Your Brain (2008)Strong Bones (2009)The Perimenopause Solution (2009)Save Your Brain: Expand Your Mind (2012)Quiet Mind: Journey of Joy'' (2013)

References

Living people
Fellows of the American College of Nutrition
Sports nutrition
Academic staff of the University of Auckland
Year of birth missing (living people)